The sixth season  of the Canadian teen drama television series  Degrassi: The Next Generation commenced airing in Canada on 28 November 2006, concluded on 14 May 2007 and contains nineteen episodes. This season depicts the lives of high school juniors, seniors and graduates as they deal with some of the challenges and issues young adults face such as imprisonment, online predators, burglary, substance abuse, stress, gambling addiction, financial difficulties, school rivalries, pregnancy scares and death. This is the first season in franchise history to feature college aged characters in prominent roles. Unlike the previous seasons, which took place over the course of an entire school year, season six only covers the fall semester (September to December) of the school year, utilizing a semi-floating timeline. It also marks the first death of a main character in the series. 

Production took place between May and September 2006.

Season six also aired in the United States Fridays at 8:00 p.m. on the Noggin cable channel during its programming block for teenagers, The N. The season actually premiered on The N, on 29 September 2006, two months before CTV, a Canadian terrestrial television network, began to screen it. By broadcasting two episodes every Tuesday night at 8:00 p.m. and 8:30 p.m., CTV were able to broadcast the final ten episodes of the season before The N. The season was released on DVD as a four disc boxed set on 27 May 2008 by Alliance Atlantis Home Entertainment in Canada, and FUNimation Entertainment in the United States. The season is also available on Canadian and US iTunes.

The season received eight award nominations, six more than it received for season five. It received mixed reviews from the media, and lacklustre ratings compared to the previous season's record high of one million viewers.

Cast

Main cast
 Shane Kippel as Gavin "Spinner" Mason (16 episodes)
 Stefan Brogren as Archie "Snake" Simpson (16 episodes)
 Cassie Steele as Manuela "Manny" Santos (15 episodes)
 Adamo Ruggiero as Marco Del Rossi (14 episodes)
 Miriam McDonald as Emma Nelson (13 episodes)
 Stacey Farber as Ellie Nash (13 episodes)
 Aubrey Graham as Jimmy Brooks (12 episodes)
 Daniel Clark as Sean Cameron (11 episodes)
 Shenae Grimes as Darcy Edwards (11 episodes)
 Jamie Johnston as Peter Stone (11 episodes)
 Melissa DiMarco as Daphne Hatzilakos (10 episodes)
 Jake Goldsbie as Toby Isaacs (10 episodes)
 Deanna Casaluce as Alex Nuñez (9 episodes)
 Sarah Barrable-Tishauer as Liberty Van Zandt (9 episodes)
 Lauren Collins as Paige Michalchuk (8 episodes)
 Mike Lobel as Jay Hogart (8 episodes)
 Ryan Cooley as James Tiberius "J.T." Yorke (7 episodes)
 Melissa McIntyre as Ashley Kerwin (7 episodes)
 Amanda Stepto as Christine "Spike" Nelson (6 episodes)
 Jake Epstein as Craig Manning (2 episodes)

Recurring cast
 Steve Belford as Jesse Stefanovic (9 episodes)
 John Bregar as Dylan Michalchuk (8 episodes)
 Nina Dobrev as Mia Jones (8 episodes)
 Marc Donato as Derek Haig (8 episodes)
 Dalmar Abuzeid as Danny Van Zandt (8 episodes)
 Michael Kinney as Coach Darryl Armstrong (4 episodes)
 Jajube Mandiela as Chantay Black (4 episodes)
 Tony Sciara as Mr. Del Rossi (3 episodes)
 Paul Miller as Mr. Stone (3 episodes)
 Romina D'Ugo as Nina (3 episodes)
 Devon Bostick as Nic (3 episodes)
 Caroline Park as Kim (3 episodes)
 Ayumi Iizuka as Ms. Lee (3 episodes)
 Samantha Munro as Lakehurst Cheerleader Tryout Girl (2 episodes)
 Larissa Vouloukos as Isabella Jones (2 episodes)
 Aislinn Paul as Clare Edwards (2 episodes)
 Jennifer Podemski as Ms. Chantel Sauvé (2 episodes)
 Joe Pingue as Tony (2 episodes)
 Scott Paterson as Johnny DiMarco (2 episodes)
 Mazin Elsadig as Damian Hayes (2 episodes)
 Susan Cuthbert as Mrs. Michalchuk (2 episodes)
 Genelle Williams as Carla Carlisle (2 episodes)
 Brooke Johnson as Professor Janes (2 episodes)
 Kashif Khan as Paige's Classmate (2 episodes)
 Conrad Dunn as Vlad (2 episodes)
 Debra Lynne McCabe as Emily Nuñez (2 episodes)
 Tony Munch as Chad Kent (2 episodes)
 Sarah Plommer as Sherry Jubilee (2 episodes)
 Kristina Pesic as Mel (2 episodes)
 Rick Little as Announcer (2 episodes)

Guest Stars
 Peter Xynnis as Uncle Louie (1 episode)
 Ella Chan as Amberley (1 episode)
 Deborah Tenant as Housing Coordinator (1 episode)
 Dwain Murphy as Eric (1 episode)
 Jean Daigle as Crown Attorney (1 episode)
 Charlotte Arnold as Cheerleader Tryout Girl on Bench (1 episode)
 Imali Perera as Svetlana (1 episode)
 Mike Realba as Doctor (1 episode)
 Erin Carter as Lakehurst Student (1 episode)
 Chantal Craig as Chair (1 episode)
 Jessica Feliz as Briana (1 episode)
 Amruta Vyas as Niner (1 episode)
 Jeffrey R. Smith as Adams (1 episode)
 Ian Jutsun as Officer (1 episode)
 Conrad Coates as Mr. Jemaine Brooks (1 episode)
 Greta Onieogou as Sirina (1 episode)
 Jana Hendrickson as Sirina's Friend #1 (1 episode)
 Bianca Guthrie as Sirina's Friend #2 (1 episode)
 Andrew Craig as Robber (1 episode)
 Pete Zedlacher as Cop (1 episode)
 Tom Melissis as Mr. Dom Perino (1 episode)
 John Vallis as Leyton (1 episode)
 Brad Hart as Backstage Dude (1 episode)
 Taking Back Sunday as Themselves (1 episode)
 Terrence Bryant as Dr. Kendrick (1 episode)
 Izzy Korn as Garbage Man (1 episode)
 Richard D. Leko as Sound Mixing Board Operator (1 episode)
 Timothy Niverth Jr. as Tim (1 episode)
 Alessandra Cannito as Nora (1 episode)
 Brendan McMurtry Howlett as Drake Lempkey (1 episode)
 Collette Micks as Doctor (1 episode)
 Leo Vernik as Detective (1 episode)
 Josh Janowicz as Lakehurst Student (1 episode)
 Anne Anglin as Mrs. Cooney (1 episode)
 Calvin Strachan as Reporter (1 episode)
 Marie V. Cruz as Mrs. Julietta Santos (1 episode)
 Linlyn Lue as Ms. Laura Kwan (1 episode)
 David Krae as Julien Gerber (1 episode)
 Mark Forward as Judge #1 (1 episode)
 Brona Brown as Mrs. Louisa Del Rossi (1 episode)
 Brian Paul as Mr. Michalchuk (1 episode)
 Ryan Hollyman as Policeman (1 episode)
 Peter Schoelier as Old Man (1 episode)
 Matt Steinberg as Admissions Officer (1 episode)
 Aaron Kyte as Guy (1 episode)
 Nicholas Carella as Kevin (1 episode)
 Lara Jean Chorostecki as Molly (1 episode)
 Moti Yona as Jake (1 episode)
 Debra Felstead as Officer (1 episode)
 Jimmy Loftus as Janitor (1 episode)
 David Klar as Neckman (1 episode)
 Brandon Chiev Thomas as Guy in Campus Club (1 episode)
 Melanie Phillipson as Stephanie (1 episode)
 Angelo Celeste as Cop (1 episode)
 Richard Hardacre as Allan (1 episode)

Crew
The season was produced by Epitome Pictures in association with CTV. Funding was provided by The Canadian Film or Video Production Tax Credit and the Ontario Film and Television Tax Credit, the Canadian Television Fund and BCE-CTV Benefits, The Shaw Television Broadcast Fund, the Independent Production Fund, Mountain Cable Program, and RBC Royal Bank.

Linda Schuyler, co-creator of the Degrassi franchise and CEO of Epitome Pictures, was the co-executive producer of season six with her husband and Epitome Pictures' president, Stephen Stohn. James Hurst also served as an executive producer. David Lowe served as the producer, and Shelley Scarrow was the executive creative consultant. Brendon Yorke and Nicole Demerse were co-executive story editors, with Duana Taha as the junior story editor. The editors were Stephen Withrow and Jason B. Irvine, Stephen Stanley was the production designer, and the cinematographers were Gavin Smith and John Berrie. The writers for the season are Tassie Cameron, Nicole Demerse, James Hurst, Aaron Martin, Will Pascoe, Shelley Scarrow, Duana Taha, and Brendon Yorke. Phil Earnshaw, Eleanore Lindo, Stefan Scaini, Gavin Smith, and Sudz Sutherland directed the episodes.

Reception
Season six was watched by fewer Canadian viewers than season five, which achieved an average of 767,000 viewers, and had one episode watched by a million viewers. The first twelve episodes of season six only averaged 500,000 viewers; the first episode after the winter break, broadcast on March 28, 2007, was watched by a season high of 645,000 viewers. The season finale was watched by 520,000 viewers, and the season eventually averaged 522,000 viewers.

The sixth season received mixed reviews from the media. Laura Betker of the Winnipeg Sun said, "Wrapping up plot lines so quickly creates a bit of disappointment for audiences. Typically, season finales end with exciting cliffhangers to entice fan interest. Degrassi’s finale really had no loose ends. There is no pending excitement for fans and the two-part finale became a disappointment. The episodes felt more like a series finale rather than just a season ending." In his end of year review, Joel Rubnoff of the Waterloo Region Record said Degrassi: The Next Generation was one of the best shows of 2007, adding, "The greatest teen show on the planet rediscovers its mojo with a same sex romance between control freak Paige and teen rebel Alexa. The year's most compelling—and bittersweet—love story." AfterEllen.com, a website which focuses on the portrayal of lesbian and bisexual women in the media, and owned by MTV Networks' Logo cable television network reported on the portrayal of two Degrassi: The Next Generation lesbian characters. "Paige and Alex's relationship, developed over three seasons, has become one of the best portrayals of a lesbian teen relationship we've seen on American television," said Sarah Warn, the website's Editor in Chief, before giving the series an "A" Grade for the portrayal of class issues, character development, sexual orientation, dialogue, the relationship and lesbian sex.

The season received nominations for eight different awards, and won two. At the Directors Guild of Canada Awards, the episode "Can't Hardly Wait" was nominated in the category for "Outstanding Achievement in a Television Series – Family", and Stephen Stanley was nominated in the "Outstanding Achievement in Production Design – Television Series" category for "What's it Feel Like To Be a Ghost? Part Two". At the Gemini Awards, Shenae Grimes won the category for "Best Performance in a Children's or Youth Program or Series" for her portrayal of Darcy Edwards in the episode "Eyes Without a Face Part Two". Degrassi: The Next Generation received three other Gemini Award nominations, for "Best Children's or Youth Fiction Program or Series", "Best Original Music Score for a Dramatic Series", and "Best Sound in a Dramatic Series". In the US, the series won its second Teen Choice Award for "Choice Summer TV Show", and Marc Donato was nominated for "Best Performance in a TV Comedy Series Recurring Young Actor" at the Young Artist Awards.

Episodes
Season six premiered during Noggin's teen-oriented block, "The N," two months before its CTV debut. It was not until the ninth episode that Canadian viewers were able to watch an episode before US viewers. The N aired the season in three separate waves, airing the first third of the season between 29 September 2006 and 17 November 2006, then the second run of episodes between 5 January 2007 and 16 February 2007. The final episodes of the season were broadcast between 29 June 2007 and 3 August 2007. Every episode aired on Fridays at 8:00 p.m.

In Canada, CTV aired the season in two separate waves of episodes. The first twelve episodes aired between 28 November 2006 and 9 January 2007, on Tuesdays at 8:00 p.m. and 8:30 p.m. The second wave of episodes aired between 28 March 2007 and 14 May 2007. The first two episodes in this wave aired on Wednesdays at 9:30 p.m., immediately after CTV's simulcast of American Idol; from 9 April 2007, the remaining episodes aired on Mondays at 9:30 p.m., immediately following CTV's simulcast of Dancing with the Stars. CTV also broadcast episodes fourteen and fifteen before episode thirteen.

This list is by order of production, as they appear on the DVD.

DVD release
The DVD release of season six was released by Alliance Atlantis Home Entertainment in Canada, and by FUNimation Entertainment in the US on 27 May 2008 after it had completed broadcast on television. As well as every episode from the season, the DVD release features bonus material including deleted scenes, bloopers and behind-the-scenes featurettes.

References

External links
Season 6 episode synopses at CTV Television Network
 List of Degrassi: The Next Generation episodes at IMDB.

Degrassi: The Next Generation seasons
2006 Canadian television seasons
2007 Canadian television seasons